Julie Todaro is an American librarian.  She served as president of the American Library Association from 2016–2017.

Career 
Todaro currently serves as the Dean of Library Services at Austin Community College in Austin, Texas. She has been a member of the American Library Association since 1972.

She previously served as president of the Association of College and Research Libraries from 2007–2008, and of the Texas Library Association from 2000–2001.

Selected publications 
Library Management for the Digital Age: A New Paradigm, Rowman and Littlefield, 2014
Emergency Preparedness for Libraries, Government Institutes, 2009
Training Library Staff and Volunteers to Provide Extraordinary Customer Service, Neal-Schuman, 2006 (co-author)

References

 
 

Year of birth missing (living people)
Living people
American librarians
American women librarians
Presidents of the American Library Association
21st-century American women